The 2020–21 season was FC Rostov's 91st season in existence and the club's 12th consecutive season in the top flight of Russian football. In addition to the domestic league, Rostov participated in this season's editions of the Russian Cup and the UEFA Europa League. The season covers the period from 1 August 2020 to 30 June 2021. Rostov finished the season in 9th place, reached the Round of 16 of the Russian Cup and where knocked out of the UEFA Europa League at the third round stage.

Season events
On 4 August, Rostov announced the signing of Aleksandr Smirnov.

On 10 August, Aleksandr Zuyev moved permanently to Rubin Kazan, where he'd been on loan at the previous season.

On 14 August, Danila Vedernikov joined Volgar Astrakhan on a season-long loan deal, and Björn Bergmann Sigurðarson left the club to re-join Lillestrøm.

On 15 August, Danila Proshlyakov joined Torpedo Moscow on a season-long loan deal.

On 20 August, Rostov announced that Saeid Ezatolahi had left the club to sign for Vejle, and that Aleksandr Saplinov had Rotor Volgograd on a season-long loan deal, with Rostov retaining the possibility of recalling Saplinov during the winter transfer window.

On 23 August, Rostov and Sochi agreed a swap deal with Ivelin Popov joining Sochi and Dmitry Poloz returning to Rostov.

On 2 September, Rostov announced that Aleksandr Pavlovets would join Rostov when his Dynamo Brest contract expires.

On 18 September, Rostov's game against Rotor Volgograd was postponed due to a COVID-19 outbreak within the Rotor Volgograd squad. On 22 September, Rostov were awarded a 3-0 technical victory over Rotor Volgograd.

On 25 September, Konstantin Pliyev was loaned to Ufa for the season.

On 1 October, Eldor Shomurodov left Rostov to sign for Genoa, and Vladimir Obukhov joined Rostov from Tambov.

On 5 October, Sarpsborg 08 announced the signing of Anton Salétros following his release by Rostov.

On 6 October, Yevgeni Chernov left Rostov to sign Krasnodar.

On 14 October, Rostov announced that Pavlovets would be completing his transfer from Dynamo Brest before the end of the current Russian transfer window. The follow day, 15 October, Aleksei Ionov left the club to sign permanently for Krasnodar, Dmitri Chistyakov moved to Zenit St.Petersburg on loan for the remainder of the season with an option for Zenit to make the deal permanent. On the same day, Denis Terentyev returned to Rostov on a permanent deal from Zenit, Pontus Almqvist joined on a five-year contract from IFK Norrköping, as did Armin Gigović from Helsingborgs IF on a similar deal.

On 16 October, Arseny Logashov and Aleksandr Dolgov moved to Khimki on season-long loan deals, and the following day Rostov signed Haitam Aleesami on a contract until the end of the season, and loaned Roman Tugarev from Lokomotiv Moscow for the season.

On 29 December, Danila Proshlyakov returned to Rostov after his loan to Torpedo Moscow was ended.

On 3 February, Maksim Turishchev signed for Rostov on a 4.5-year contract from Lokomotiv Moscow.

On 16 February, Rostov announced the loan signing of Ali Sowe from CSKA Sofia with the option to make the move permanent.

On 23 February, Roman Eremenko left Rostov by mutual consent, and David Toshevski joined Tambov on loan for the remainder of the season.

Squad

On loan

Transfers

In

 Pavlovets' move was announced on the above date, and finalised on 14 October 2020.

Loans in

Out

Loans out

Released

Friendlies

Competitions

Overview

Premier League

League table

Results summary

Results by round

Results

Russian Cup

UEFA Europa League

Qualifying rounds

Squad statistics

Appearances and goals

|-
|colspan="14"|Players away from the club on loan:

|-
|colspan="14"|Players who appeared for Rostov but left during the season:

|}

Goal scorers

Clean sheets

Disciplinary record

References

External links

FC Rostov seasons
Rostov
Rostov